John J. Dillon was an American baseball player and American college football player and coach and baseball player. Dillon was a two-sport athlete at Syracuse University, playing quarterback for the football team from 1898 to 1900 and catcher for the baseball team.

Coaching career
Dillon coached the 1901 Case School of Applied Science football team to a 2–7 record, which included a win over rival Western Reserve University.

Baseball career

Dillon played Minor League Baseball for five seasons on several teams, including on the championship 1903 Jersey City Skeeters.

Personal life
Dillon performed in theater for several years, including as early as 1905 for "The Awakening of Mr. Pipp."

Head coaching record

References

External links

Year of birth missing
Year of death missing
American football quarterbacks
Baseball catchers
Amsterdam-Gloversville-Johnstown Jags players
Case Western Spartans football coaches
Jersey City Skeeters players
Montreal Royals players
Providence Grays players
Rochester Bronchos players
Syracuse Orangemen baseball players
Syracuse Orange football players